Dynein light chain Tctex-type 1 is a protein that in humans is encoded by the DYNLT1 gene.

Cytoplasmic dynein is the major motor protein complex responsible for minus-end, microtubule-based motile processes. Each dynein complex consists of 2 heavy chains that have ATPase and motor activities, plus a group of accessory polypeptides. TCTEX1 is a dynein light chain involved in cargo binding (Chuang et al., 2005).[supplied by OMIM]

References

Further reading